Trandolapril/verapamil (Tarka) is an oral antihypertensive medication that combines a slow release formulation of verapamil hydrochloride, a calcium channel blocker, and an immediate release formulation of trandolapril, an ACE inhibitor. The patent, held by Abbott Laboratories, expired on February 24, 2015.

This combination medication contains angiotensin-converting enzyme (ACE) inhibitor and calcium channel blocker and is prescribed for high blood pressure.

References

External links 
 

Combination drugs
Antihypertensive agents
AbbVie brands